Almost Home is the fifth full-length album by the band Evergreen Terrace. Released on September 29, 2009. This is the band's last album featuring Kyle Mims and Josh James. Tha albm was It sold around 2,000 copies in the United States in its first week of release, according to Nielsen SoundScan. The CD landed at position No. 17 on the TopHeatseekers chart.

Track listing

Personnel
Evergreen Terrace
 Andrew Carey - vocals
 Kyle Mims - drums
 Josh James - guitar
 Craig Chaney - guitar, vocals

Production
 Stan Martell - bass, additional guitar on "Sending Signals" and "Almost Home (III)"
 Album artwork by Clark Orr
 Music tracking by Stan Martell
 Vocal tracking by Jason Suecof
 Mastering by Mike Fuller

Cultural references
The band is known for referring to pop culture in their titles, lyrics, and soundbites.

References

2009 albums
Evergreen Terrace albums
Metal Blade Records albums